Christopher Barry Morris (born 24 December 1963) is a former professional footballer, who played as a defender for Celtic, Sheffield Wednesday and Middlesbrough, among others. Born in England, he represented the Republic of Ireland  national team at international level.

Club career
Morris first began his career in 1982, signing for Sheffield Wednesday under ex-England international, Jack Charlton, in the old Division Two. He won promotion to the First Division with Wednesday in 1984. Morris made seventy-four appearances between 1983 and 1987, scoring one goal along the way. Morris then moved north of the border to Celtic, signing for £125,000 on 10 August 1987. He made his debut in the 4–0 win over Morton, at age 23. Between 1987 and 1992, Morris was the regular right-back for the Bhoys, with 160 appearances and 8 goals to his name.

Morris was the only Celtic player to play in all 55 games of the 1987–88 season, in which Celtic won both the Scottish Premier Division and Scottish Cup. He was on the team for a second Celtic Scottish Cup win in 1989. Morris then moved on to Middlesbrough on 14 August 1992, where he remained for several seasons as a first team regular without ever becoming a crowd favourite. Troubled by an anterior cruciate ligament injury, he retired at the end of the 1996-97 season, when Boro were runners-up in the FA Cup and Football League Cup, but a 3-point deduction for postponing a match at short notice had caused them to be relegated from the Premier League.

International career
In 1988, Morris once again caught the attention of Jack Charlton, who by then was the Republic of Ireland boss. Morris, although born in England, held dual British and Irish citizenship since birth due to being the son of an Irish mother. He was called up to play for Ireland and made a promising debut in the 5-0 friendly win against Israel at Dalymount Park on 10 November 1987. Morris soon made the number 2 shirt his own, and played his part in the successful qualification bid for Euro 88, the Republic's first ever major tournament. Morris played in all three games of the championships, including the famous 1–0 win over England. Although the Republic were eliminated following a late goal by Wim Kieft in their final group game against Holland, Morris became a household name in Ireland, along with the rest of the team, who were greeted as heroes on their return home. Morris continued in the side that qualified for World Cup 1990 in Italy, another major first for the Republic. He played in every game This time it was a goal from Salvatore Schillaci of Italy that saw Ireland off in the quarter finals, but it was another high-point for the team, and for Morris. Ireland failed to qualify for the next European Championships in 1992, and Morris played his final game against Wales on 17 November 1992.

Personal life
Morris has a daughter, Rebecca, and a son, Christopher, from his first marriage.

After leaving football, Morris went back to Cornwall to work for the family business "Morris Cornish Pasties," which his parents have run since 1971. He also coaches Bodmin College football team, who were crowned east cornwall champions in Morris's first season with them.

Honours
Celtic 
Scottish Football League: 1987–88
Scottish Cup: 1987–88 1988–89

Middlesbrough
Football League First Division: 1994–95
 Football League Cup: runner-up 1996–97
 FA Cup: runner-up 1996–97

See also

 List of Republic of Ireland international footballers born outside the Republic of Ireland

References

External links
Morris Cornish Pasties

Morris at Newcastle Fans

1963 births
Living people
People from Newquay
Republic of Ireland association footballers
Republic of Ireland international footballers
Premier League players
Footballers from Cornwall
Celtic F.C. players
Middlesbrough F.C. players
Sheffield Wednesday F.C. players
Newquay A.F.C. players
UEFA Euro 1988 players
1990 FIFA World Cup players
British people of Irish descent
Cornish people of Irish descent
English Football League players
Scottish Football League players
Scottish Football League representative players
Association football defenders